East Kilbride was a county constituency of the House of Commons of the Parliament of the United Kingdom (at Westminster) from 1974 until 2005. It returned one Member of Parliament (MP), elected by the first-past-the-post voting system.

At the 2005 general election it was merged with part of Clydesdale to form the new constituency of East Kilbride, Strathaven and Lesmahagow.

The East Kilbride Holyrood constituency, created to be coterminous in 1999, continues in use for elections to the Scottish Parliament.

Boundaries
1974–1983: The burgh of East Kilbride, the fourth district electoral division of Avondale, and the eighth district electoral divisions of Blantyre, High Blantyre, and Stonefield.

1983–1996: East Kilbride District.

Members of Parliament

Elections

Elections of the 1970s

Elections of the 1980s

Elections of the 1990s

Elections of the 2000s

References

Historic parliamentary constituencies in Scotland (Westminster)
Constituencies of the Parliament of the United Kingdom established in 1974
Constituencies of the Parliament of the United Kingdom disestablished in 2005
East Kilbride
Politics of South Lanarkshire